Fort Yuma Gold is a 1966 Italian/Spanish/French international co-production Spaghetti Western film directed by Giorgio Ferroni.

Plot
Confederate Major Sanders (Jacques Sernas), continues fighting the North after the conclusion of the American Civil War. Former Rebel Gary Diamond (Giuliano Gemma), now a guide, leads a pair of Union soldiers to obstruct Sanders before he can pull off a raid on Fort Yuma. However the others are unaware that Diamond knows that one of the Union officers is actually Sanders' spy. More complications ensue, pairing Diamond with the aptly named saloon-girl Connie Breastful (Sophie Daumier). Later Diamond is found to be a traitor and is tortured severely before Sanders' plot is foiled.

Cast
Giuliano Gemma (as Montgomery Wood) as Gary Diamond
Jacques Sernas as Maj. Sanders 
Dan Vadis as Nelson Riggs 
Sophie Daumier as Connie Breastfull 
Nello Pazzafini (as Red Carter) as Sgt. Brian Pitt
José Calvo as Gordon/Golden .44
Ángel del Pozo as Capt. Lefevre 
Jacques Herlin (as Arlen Jacques) as Riggs as prisoner, Davis camp 
Andrea Bosic as  Colonel as Davis camp 
Antonio Molino Rojo as Brian 
Benny Reeves as Juko 
Furio Meniconi (as Men Fury) as Calvin/Johnny Newman
José Manuel Martín as Sam 
Jacques Stany as Elijah Murdock 
Lorenzo Robledo as Capt. Taylor
Riccardo Pizzuti as Corporal Wilson

Release
Fort Yuma Gold was released in Italy on October 7, 1966. The film was also released with the English title The Rebel Lieutenant.

Reception
From contemporary reviews, an anonymous reviewer in the Monthly Film Bulletin described the film as "Utterly routine" with "unconvincinving fights, witless dialogue and prolonged torture, and the hero is another those unprepossessing supermen" and that the film was only distinguished by "the amazing gullibility of the villains who nonchalantly shrug off the sudden deaths of most of their colleagues as accidental."

A retrospective review on AllMovie by Robert Firsching referred to the film as a "well-paced spaghetti western" with a "labyrinthine storyline". Firsching noted that Ferroni's film "sometimes crosses the line into silliness, but remains entertaining throughout, aided by a fine score by Ennio Morricone and Gianni Ferrio."

References

Sources

External links 

1966 films
Spaghetti Western films
1966 Western (genre) films
Films directed by Giorgio Ferroni
Films scored by Ennio Morricone
Italian Western (genre) films
Spanish Western (genre) films
French Western (genre) films
1960s Italian films
1960s French films